The National Bloc of Freedom (Blocco Nazionale della Libertà) was a short-lived Italian political coalition of monarchist parties, most of which participated to the foundation of the National Monarchist Party. Its symbol was a star.

It contested the Italian elections of 1946, where it received a 3% of votes and elected 16 deputies, and lost the contemporaneous referendum about between republic or monarchy.

Immediately after the election, the coalition collapsed between populist, monarchist and liberal approaches. Only 10 deputies joined the parliamentary group. In January 1947 the coalition definitely disappeared between the Common Man's Front (6 deputies), the Monarchist National Party (7 deputies) and the Italian Liberal Party (3 deputies).

Electoral results

References

Political parties established in 1946
Defunct political party alliances in Italy
Monarchist parties in Italy